William Pitt (born William Frederick Pate) is an American-born pop singer whose single "City Lights" became a hit in several European countries in 1987.

Biography
William Pitt started singing and playing guitar in 1955 when he acquired a Sears Roebuck Harmony guitar. During the 1980s, while living in Paris, William Pitt was signed to a record deal by music producer Pascal Wüthrich.

William Pitt's single "City Lights" became a hit on its first release in France in 1986. After this, it became a hit in several other European countries following a re-release in 1987. In the Netherlands, "City Lights" reached the Top 20. The song was a disco hit in Italy during the summer of 1986 and reached the charts in 1987, peaking at 17. William Pitt's follow-up single "Funny Girl" only made it to the lower regions of the German and Belgium charts. A comeback single was released in 1990.

"City Lights" sampled the bassline from the song "Don't Look Any Further" by Dennis Edwards and Siedah Garrett.

Discography

Singles

References

Further reading

External links
 Official music video 'City Lights'
 William Pitt at Discogs.
 https://mx3.ch/justcallmewilliam

Living people
Year of birth missing (living people)
American male pop singers